3rd Street is a streetcar station located near the intersection of H Street NE and 3rd Street NE. It is located on the H Street/Benning Road Line of the DC Streetcar system.

History 
3rd Street station opened to the public as one of the original stations on February 27, 2016. On April 26, 2017, the Eastbound platform was struck by an intercity bus operated by Megabus. The bus damaged the passenger shelter, and the stop remains closed "for an extended time". The eastbound stop reopened on August 7, 2018.

Station layout
The station consists of two side platforms on either side of H Street.

References

H Street/Benning Road Line
DC Streetcar stops
Streetcars in Washington, D.C.
Electric railways in Washington, D.C.
Street railways in Washington, D.C.
750 V DC railway electrification
Railway stations in the United States opened in 2016
2016 establishments in Washington, D.C.